Attla may refer to:

 George Attla, Alaska Sports Hall of Fame inductee and dog musher
 Attla (film), 1979 film about George Attla
 Attla, codename of an Intel Corporation computer LAN controller
 Attla River, near Ramayapalem in Marripudi Mandal, India
 Attla, Dutch launch boat that aided the crew of the USS S-36 (SS-141) submarine as it sank in January 1942